David Berger may refer to:

 David Berger (attorney), deputy district attorney, Los Angeles, California
 David Berger (Canadian politician) (born 1950), former member of Canada's Parliament and ambassador to Israel
 David Berger (historian) (born 1942), Professor and Dean of Jewish Studies at Yeshiva University, rabbi and author
 David Berger (Wisconsin politician) (born 1946), former Wisconsin State Senator and State Assemblyman
 David Mark Berger (1944–1972), American-Israeli Olympic athlete killed in the Munich massacre
 David Berger (theologian) (born 1968), German neo-thomist, former professor of the Pontifical Academy of St. Thomas Aquinas (Vatican)
 David H. Berger (born 1959), U.S. Marine Corps general
 David Berger, German musician previously in the band Topictoday
 , American jazz musician

See also
 Berger (disambiguation)